Thomas Jung (1 November 1957 – September 2022) was a German politician. A member of Alternative for Germany, he served in the Landtag of Brandenburg from 2014 to 2019.

He supported the Election Alternative in 2013 and joined the AfD. He was an assessor on the state executive committee of the AfD Brandenburg and became a member of the state expert committees Interior and Justice, BER and Budget and Finance, as well as the program commission. He was spokesman for the state specialist committees Freedom and Justice in Security and Germany, Euro and Europe and chairman of the AfD district association Potsdam.  

Jung died in September 2022, at the age of 64.

References

1957 births
2022 deaths
German lawyers
21st-century German politicians
Alternative for Germany politicians
Christian Democratic Union of Germany politicians
Members of the Landtag of Brandenburg
Free University of Berlin alumni
University of Vienna alumni
University of Erlangen-Nuremberg alumni
University of Hagen alumni
People from Birkenfeld (district)